Post Present Medium (or PPM) is an Independent Record Label l started and run by Dean Allen Spunt, also from the band No Age. 

Spunt started the label in 2001 with the release of a 7" by Portland/Olympia post punk band The Intima. Initial funding came from a settlment Spunt received as a teenager, when he got into a car accident with a member of the Backstreet Boys. PPM has released records from artists that include Mika Miko, Abe Vigoda, Barr, Best Coast, No Age, Gun Outfit, Silk Flowers, John Wiese, Eric Copeland, Infinite Body, and SFV Acid. PPM has at least 75 releases to date. Releases typically get 500 to 1000 pressings.

Currently the roster includes Behavior, Syko Friend, Otis Houston Jr., P22, Gen Pop, Mayako XO, Brontez Purnell, Chronophage.

References

Record labels based in California
2001 establishments in California
American independent record labels
Record labels established in 2001